is a railway station on the Shinetsu Main Line in the city of Sanjō, Niigata, Japan, operated by East Japan Railway Company (JR East).

Lines
Sanjō Station is served by the Shinetsu Main Line, and is 94.6 kilometers from the terminus of the line at Naoetsu Station.

Station layout
The station consists of two ground-level opposed side platforms connected by a footbridge, serving two tracks. The station has a Midori no Madoguchi staffed ticket office.

Platforms

History
Sanjō Station opened on 16 June 1898. With the privatization of Japanese National Railways (JNR) on 1 April 1987, the station came under the control of JR East.

Passenger statistics
In fiscal 2017, the station was used by an average of 1820 passengers daily (boarding passengers only).

Surrounding area

 Corona Corporation HQ
 Niigata Prefectural Sanjo High School

See also
 List of railway stations in Japan

References

External links

 JR East station information 

Railway stations in Niigata Prefecture
Stations of East Japan Railway Company
Railway stations in Japan opened in 1898
Shin'etsu Main Line
Sanjō, Niigata